Máire Mhac an tSaoi (4 April 1922 – 16 October 2021) was an Irish civil service official, writer of Modernist poetry in the Corca Dhuibhne dialect of Munster Irish, a writer, and highly important figure within Modern literature in Irish. Along with Seán Ó Ríordáin and Máirtín Ó Direáin, Máire Mhac an tSaoi was, in the words of Louis de Paor, "one of a trinity of poets who revolutionised Irish language poetry in the 1940s and 50s."

Early life
Mhac an tSaoi was born as Máire MacEntee in Dublin in 1922. Her father, Seán MacEntee, was born in Belfast and was a veteran of the Irish Volunteers during the Easter Rising of 1916 and the subsequent Irish War of Independence, and of the Anti-Treaty IRA during the Irish Civil War. MacEntee was also a founding member of Fianna Fáil, a long-serving TD and Tánaiste in the Dáil. Her mother, County Tipperary-born Margaret Browne (or de Brún), a teacher at Alexandra College, was also an Irish republican. Her uncle Monsignor Pádraig de Brún was a scholar of the Irish language. Her other uncle was the Traditionalist Catholic Cardinal Michael Browne, who was Master of the Dominican Order and, in his later life, a friend and ally of Archbishop Marcel Lefebvre.

As Máire's mother was a teacher of Irish, she grew up immersed in the surviving Bardic poetry and in "the medieval aristocratic tradition of courtly love poems in Irish." She was also, according to Louis De Paor, heavily influenced by her stays with her uncle, Monsignor De Brún, whom, in addition to his priestly duties, was studying the Corca Dhuibhne dialect of Munster Irish in the parish of Dún Chaoin. As Louis de Paor writes, Mhac an tSaoi discovered while visiting her uncle in Dún Chaoin, "a living tradition and a community conscious of its literary and linguistic inheritance, a world in which verbal artistry by accomplished speakers capable of responding to the impulse of the momentum sophisticated extemporary compositions. The extent to which the Gaeltacht of her early life was an imagined as well as an actual place has been acknowledged by the poet herself, but her relationship to 'the miraculous parish,' of Dún Chaoin is both the cornerstone of both her poetry and her poetics."

Máire studied Modern Languages and Celtic Studies at University College Dublin, before going to further research at the Dublin Institute for Advanced Studies and at the Sorbonne.

Literary career
According to Louis De Paor, "Máire Mhac an tSaoi spent two years studying in post-war Paris (1945–47) before joining the Irish diplomatic service, and was working at the Irish embassy in Madrid, during Franco's regime, when she committed herself to writing poetry in Irish following her discovery of the works of Federico Garcia Lorca. The tension between religious beliefs, contemporary social mores, and the more transgressive elements of female desire is central to the best of her work from the 1940s and early 1950s. Both her deference to traditional patterns of language and verse and her refusal of traditional morality might be read as a reaction to the social, moral, and cultural upheaval of a world at war."

She remained a prolific poet and was credited, along with Seán Ó Ríordáin and Máirtín Ó Direáin, with reintroducing literary modernism into Irish literature in the Irish-language, where it had been dormant since the 1916 execution of Patrick Pearse, in the years and decades following World War II. According to De Paor, "Máire Mhac an Tsaoi's poetry draws on the vernacular spoken by the native Irish speakers of the Munster Gaeltacht of West Kerry during the first half of the twentieth century. Formally, she draws on the song metres of the oral tradition and on older models from the earlier literary tradition, including the syllabic metres of the early modern period. The combination of spoken dialect enhanced by references and usages drawn from the older literature, and regular metrical forms contribute to a poetic voice that seems to resonate with the accumulated authority of an unbroken tradition. In the later work, she explores looser verse forms but continues to draw on the remembered dialect of Dún Chaoin and on a scholarly knowledge of the older literature."

She was elected to Aosdána in 1996, but resigned in 1997 after Francis Stuart was elevated to the position of Saoi. Mhac an tSaoi had voted against Stuart because of his role as an Abwehr spy and in radio propaganda broadcasts from Nazi Germany aimed at neutral Ireland during World War II.

Mhac an tSaoi had a lifelong passion for the Irish language, and was one of the leading authorities on Munster Irish.

In 2001, Mhac an tSaoi published an award-winning novel A Bhean Óg Ón... about the relationship between the 17th-century County Kerry poet and Irish clan chief, and folk hero Piaras Feiritéar and Meg Russell, the woman for whom he wrote his greatest works of love poetry in the Irish language.

Her poem "Jack" and An Bhean Óg Ón both have featured on the Leaving Certificate Irish course, at both Higher and Ordinary Levels, from 2006 to 2010.

Personal life
In 1962, she married Irish politician, writer, and historian Conor Cruise O'Brien (1917–2008) in a Roman Catholic Wedding Mass in Dublin. This made Máire the stepmother to O'Brien's children from his 1939 civil marriage.

She was opposed to the Vietnam War, attending a protest against it in 1969.

She travelled with him to the Republic of the Congo when he was chosen by Secretary-General Dag Hammarskjöld as the United Nations representative there during the Katanga Crisis. Máire then lived with her husband in New York City, where he worked as a Humanities professor at NYU after the Katanga Crisis ended O'Brien's diplomatic career. She later returned with him to live in Dublin.

The O'Briens later adopted two children, Patrick and Margaret.

List of works
Mhac an tSaoi wrote:
 Margadh na Saoire (Baile Átha Cliath: Sáirséal agus Dill, 1956)
 Codladh an Ghaiscigh (1973)
 An Galar Dubhach (1980)
 An Cion go dtí Seo (1987)
 "Writing In Modern Irish — A Benign Anachronism?", The Southern Review, 31 Special Issue on Irish Poetry (1995)
 The Same Age as the State, O'Brien Press, Dublin ; 
 Cérbh í Meg Russell?, Leabhar Breac,  (2008).
 Scéal Ghearóid Iarla, Leabhar Breac,  (2010).

Mhac an tSaoi and O'Brien together wrote:
 A Concise History of Ireland, Thames and Hudson, London  (1972)

Mhac an tSaoi translated Rainer Maria Rilke:
 Marbhnaí Duino (Duineser Elegien), Leabhar Breac,   (2013)

References

1922 births
2021 deaths
20th-century Irish poets
20th-century Irish-language poets
20th-century Irish women writers
21st-century Irish poets
21st-century Irish women writers
Academics of the Dublin Institute for Advanced Studies
Alumni of University College Dublin
Aosdána members
Diplomats from Dublin (city)
German–Irish translators
Irish expatriates in France
Irish expatriates in Spain
Irish expatriates in the United States
Irish-language poets
Irish modernist poets
Irish women diplomats
Irish women poets
New York University faculty
People from Ranelagh
Translators from German
Translators to Irish